Cottonwood High School is the name of various secondary schools in the United States:

Cottonwood High School (Cottonwood, Alabama)
Cottonwood High School (Murray, Utah)
Cottonwood High School (Arizona) (closed 1958)